Katariri (Aymara katari a big viper, -ri a suffix, also spelled Catariri) is a  high a mountain in the Bolivian Andes. It is located on the border of the Chuquisaca Department, Oropeza Province, Poroma Municipality, and the Potosí Department, Chayanta Province, Ravelo Municipality. It lies northeast of Chullpa Urqu

References 

Mountains of Chuquisaca Department
Mountains of Potosí Department